The Canadian ambassador to Argentina is the official representative of the Canadian government to the government of Argentina. The official title for the ambassador is the Ambassador Extraordinary and Plenipotentiary of Canada to the Argentine Republic. The current Canadian ambassador is Reid Sirrs who was appointed on the advice of Prime Minister Justin Trudeau on December 20, 2021.

The Embassy of Canada is located at Tagle 2828, C1425EEH Buenos Aires, Argentina.

History of diplomatic relations 

Diplomatic relations between Canada and Argentina was established on November 14, 1940. A legation was established on November 13, 1941, and was raised to full embassy status on October 1, 1945. William Ferdinand Alphonse Turgeon was appointed as Canada's first Ambassador to Argentina on July 31, 1941.

List of Canadian ambassadors to Argentina

See also 
 List of ambassadors and high commissioners of Canada

Notes

References 

Bibliography

External links 
 

Argentina
 
Canada